Abhi Tailor is an Indian Tamil-language drama television series, starring Reshma Muralidharan and Madhan Pandian. The show is produced by Media Mogul and directed by Suresh Shanmugam. It aired on Colors Tamil from 19 July 2021, to 19 August 2022, every Monday to Saturday for 398 episodes. It is also available for streaming on Voot.

Cast

Main 
 Reshma Muralidharan as Abhirami
 Madhan Pandian as Ashok

Recurring 
 Reshma Pasupuleti as Anamika: Ashok's elder sister
 Sona Heiden as Neelambari: Ashok's mother
 Siddharth Kapilavayi as Jaganathan: Ashok's elder brother-in-law
 Srinivasan → Sathish as Chakravarthy: Ashok's father
 Jayashri Chaki as Anandhi: Abhirami's younger sister
 Sanjay Raja as Aravind: Abhirami's younger brother
 Badava Gopi as Sundaramoorthy: Abhirami's father
 Vishnu → Santhosh as Atharva: Ashok's younger brother
 Dharani Reddy → Suja Vasan → Chandini Prakash as Vaishali: Ashok's maternal cousin; Vishwanathan's daughter
 Kevin as Indrajith: Ashok's maternal cousin; Vishwanathan's son
 Mythili Sathyajith → Rekha Angelina as Indira: Ashok's maternal aunt
 Vetri Kiran Kumar → Prakash Rajan as Vishwanathan: Ashok's maternal uncle; Neelambari's younger brother
 Anitha Venkat as Subbulakshmi
 Nivy Nivetha as Subathra: Ashok's secretary
 Mani KL → Adaavadi Ansar as Ganesha
 VJ Tara as Dhanalakshmi
 Subhageetha as Deivanai
 Vishnukanth → Sudharsanam as Raghu: Abhi's friend
 C. Ranganathan as VKR: Raghu's father
 Gemini Mani as Manickam
 KPY Adhi as Narayanan
 Farina Azad as Bhavani: Abhirami's friend

References

External links 

Colors Tamil original programming
Tamil-language romance television series
2021 Tamil-language television series debuts
Tamil-language television shows
2022 Tamil-language television series endings